The Siemens Transportation Group is a Canadian transportation business, headquartered in Saskatoon, Saskatchewan, that provides transportation.  In 2011 the group operated a total of 43 trucks and 753 tractor trailer trucks, with 1,893 trailers. 
The first company in the group was Kindersley Transport Ltd. founded in 1962, by Erwen Siemens, the organization has grown into a group of over 15 companies providing transportation services.

KTL Express
KTL Express is part of the Siemens Transportation Group that provides local courier services in Western Canada with terminals in Toronto, Winnipeg, Regina, Saskatoon, Edmonton, Kelowna, Calgary and Vancouver.

References

External links
Official website

Canadian companies established in 1962
Transport companies established in 1962
Distribution companies of Canada
Companies based in Saskatoon
Logistics companies of Canada
1962 establishments in Saskatchewan